Don't You is the debut studio album by American band Wet. It was released on January 29, 2016 by Columbia Records.

Track listing

Notes
  signifies an assistant producer.

Personnel
Musicians
 Noah Beresin – piano (tracks 1, 2, 5)
 Chris Smith – background vocals (3, 4), keyboards (3), vocals (8)
 Nat Baldwin – bass (4, 11)
 Patrick Wimberly – strings (4, 5, 10), piano (11)
 Kelsey Lu – cello (4, 5, 10, 11)
 Marques Toliver – violin (4, 5, 10, 11)

Technical
 Ted Jensen – mastering
 Tom Elmhirst – mixing
 Joe Visciano – mixing (6), engineering assistance (all tracks)
 Danny Bernini – engineering (1, 2, 5, 9)
 Mark Alan Miller – engineering (1, 4)
 Billy Pavone – engineering (3, 9)
 Chris Pummil – engineering (4)
 Christopher Chase – engineering (4, 10, 11)
 Miles B.A. Robinson – engineering (4, 5, 10, 11)
 Matt Shane – engineering (8)
 Alex Epton – engineering (9)
 Richard Levengood – engineering assistance (4)
 Brandon Bost – engineering assistance (6)

Charts

References

2016 debut albums
Wet (band) albums
Columbia Records albums
Albums produced by Patrick Wimberly